Juncker–Asselborn Ministry II was the government of Luxembourg between 23 July 2009 and 11 July 2013.  It was led by, and named after, Prime Minister Jean-Claude Juncker and Deputy Prime Minister Jean Asselborn.  It was formed on 23 July 2009, after the 2009 election to the Chamber of Deputies. 
It fell after the withdrawal of the Luxembourg Socialist Workers' Party from the government; Prime Minister Juncker submitted his resignation to the Grand Duke on 11 July 2013, and a snap election was called.

Ministers

Formation 
The Christian Social People's Party (CSV) emerged the winner of the election of 7 June 2009. It received 38,04 % of the votes and 26 seats. Its coalition partner, the Luxembourg Socialist Workers' Party (LSAP), lost one seat and was left with 13 members in the new Chamber of Deputies. It remained however the second-strongest party in terms of seats. The Democratic Party, which had already experienced loses at the previous elections in 2004, was left with only 9 seats, (down from 10 in 2004 and 15 in 1999). The Greens repeated their positive results from 2004 and received 7 seats. The ADR, which in April 2006 had changed its name from Aktiounskomitee fir Demokratie a Rentegerechtegkeet to Alternativ Demokratesch Reformpartei, did not managed to increase its voter base and only received 4 seats (5 in 2004). On the other hand, the Left, having been absent from the parliament in 2004-2009, was again represented by one Deputy. The two other parties registered at the elections, the Communist Party and the "Citizens' List" (Biergerlëscht), received no seats. After the elections, the CSV started coalition talks with the LSAP to form a "government of continuity and responsibility". The coalition agreement was signed on 20 July and three days later the new government was sworn in at Berg Castle.

See also 
 List of members of the Chamber of Deputies of Luxembourg 2009–13

References 
 

Ministries of Luxembourg
History of Luxembourg (1945–present)
2009 establishments in Luxembourg
Cabinets established in 2009